Walk Together, Rock Together is a studio album by hardcore punk band 7 Seconds, released in 1985. The album was originally released as an EP, but was later expanded into a full-length album.

Background
Walk Together, Rock Together was originally released as an EP in 1985. In 1986, it was expanded into a full length by adding live songs to the albums B-Side. The studio tracks were produced by Minor Threat singer Ian MacKaye, who also provided backing vocals, and mixed by Bad Religion guitarist Brett Gurewitz.

Critical reception
AllMusic called the album "an essential chapter of early hardcore." Maximum Rocknroll wrote that "all the pleasant harmonies and sing-alongs are present in full form, and the well thought-out lyrics that make this band what they are." Trouser Press wrote that the album "demonstrates an early interest in slowing things down and tuning them up along positive Clash/Pistols lines."

Track listing 
All songs written by Kevin Seconds, except where noted.
 "Regress No Way" - 1:09
 "We're Gonna Fight" - 3:24
 "In Your Face" - 1:07
 "Spread" - 1:09
 "99 Red Balloons" (Uwe Fahrenkrog-Petersen, Carlo Karges) - 3:41
 "Remains to Be Seen" - 1:31
 "Walk Together, Rock Together" - 1:48 
 "How Do You Think You'd Feel" - 1:34
 "Strength" - 2:24
 "Still Believe [Live]" - 1:39
 "Out of Touch [Live]" - 1:49
 "Drug Control [Live]" - 0:45
 "Bottomless Pit [Live]" - 1:23
 "This Is the Angry Pt. 2/New Wind/We're Gonna Fight [Live]" - 5:16

Personnel

Kevin Seconds: Lead Vocals 
Dan Pozniak: Guitar, Vocals 
Troy Mowat: Drums 
Steve Youth: Bass, Piano

References

1984 albums
7 Seconds (band) albums
BYO Records albums